Rasputin, the Holy Sinner (German: Rasputins Liebesabenteuer) is a 1928 German silent film directed by Martin Berger and starring Nikolai Malikoff, Diana Karenne and Erwin Kalser. The film was also released as Rasputin, the Holy Devil and Rasputin's Amorous Adventures.  Director Berger made Rasputin into a sympathetic peasant character who was "exploited by the boorish and overly pampered bourgeoisie".

The film was one of Berger's biggest productions according to its budget and boasted a distinguished cast, including Alfred Abel and Max Schreck. Russian-born actor Nikolai Malikoff received glowing reviews for his portrayal of Rasputin, although his film career petered out soon after due to the advent of sound. (This film is sometimes confused with a 1928 German-Russian film called Rasputin (1928 film).)

Plot
A simple Russian peasant named Gregori Rasputin seems able to perform miracles and soon comes to the attention of the Tsar and Tsarina of the Russian royal family who elevate him to the rank of spiritual advisor. Rasputin's control over them grows, and members of the hierarchy fear he is trying to increase his own political power. They develop a plot to assassinate Rasputin.

Cast

References

External links

Films of the Weimar Republic
Films directed by Martin Berger
German silent feature films
Films set in the 1900s
Films set in the 1910s
Films about Grigori Rasputin
Cultural depictions of Nicholas II of Russia
Biographical films about Russian royalty
German black-and-white films